In enzymology, an allophanate hydrolase is an enzyme that catalyzes the chemical reaction

allophanate + 3 H2O + H+  2 HCO3− + 2 NH4+

Thus, the two substrates of this enzyme are allophanate (urea-1-carboxylate or N-carbamoylcarbamate) and H2O, whereas its two products are HCO3− and NH4+.

This enzyme belongs to the family of hydrolases, those acting on carbon-nitrogen bonds other than peptide bonds, specifically in linear amides.  The systematic name of this enzyme class is urea-1-carboxylate amidohydrolase. This enzyme is also called allophanate lyase.  This enzyme participates in urea cycle and metabolism of amino groups and atrazine degradation.

See also
Urea carboxylase

References
 
 
 
 

EC 3.5.1
Enzymes of unknown structure